Richard Hammond is a British presenter, writer and journalist best known for presenting Top Gear.

Richard Hammond may also refer to:
Richard Hammond (physicist), physicist and author
Richard Pindle Hammond (1896–1980), American composer
Richard P. Hammond (politician) (Richard Pindell Hammond), Speaker of the California State Assembly from January–May 1852

See also

Richard Hamming (1915–1998), American mathematician